Jean-Claude Briault (born 21 August 1947 in Nouméa) is a New Caledonian politician.  He has served in the Congress of New Caledonia as a member of The Rally-UMP.

References

1947 births
Living people
People from Nouméa
Members of the Congress of New Caledonia
The Rally (New Caledonia) politicians